Azadeh N. Shahshahani is an American human rights attorney based in Atlanta. She is the legal and advocacy director for Project South. She previously served as president of the National Lawyers Guild and director of the National Security/Immigrants' Rights Project for the American Civil Liberties Union (ACLU) of Georgia.

Early life and education
Shahshahani was born in Tehran a few days after the 1979 Iranian Revolution. She received her J.D. from the University of Michigan Law School, where she served as article editor for the Michigan Journal of International Law. Shahshahani also has a master's degree in modern Middle Eastern and North African studies from the University of Michigan.

Career
Shahshahani has worked for a number of years in the U.S. South to protect the human rights of immigrants and Muslim, Middle Eastern, and South Asian communities.

She is the author or editor of several human rights reports, including the report Imprisoned Justice: Inside Two Immigrant Detention Centers in Georgia; the report Inside Atlanta's Immigration Cages, which helped persuade the City of Atlanta to stop detaining immigrants for ICE at the city jail; as well as the 2020 Project South complaint that brought national and international attention to medical abuses against women's bodies at the Irwin County Detention Center.

Shahshahani has also served as counsel in lawsuits on behalf of a deported U.S. citizen, a Muslim woman forced to remove her headcovering at a courthouse, detained immigrants subjected to forced labor at the corporate-run Stewart Detention Center, immigrant women survivors of medical abuse at the Irwin County Detention Center, and many others who have suffered human rights violations.

Shahshahani has served as a trial monitor in Turkey, an election monitor in Venezuela and Honduras, and as a member of the jury in people's tribunals on Mexico, the Philippines, and Brazil.  She has also participated in international fact-finding delegations to post-revolutionary Tunisia and Egypt as well as a delegation focused on the situation of Palestinian political prisoners.

Shahshahani serves on the advisory council of the American Association of Jurists and as a board member of Defending Rights & Dissent.

She speaks frequently at law school and colleges campuses on topics ranging from movement lawyering to roots of forced migration, U.S. foreign policy, abolition of ICE prisons, and countering state surveillance and repression against Muslim communities, among others.

Shahshahani has appeared on Democracy Now! and BBC; has been interviewed by NPR and The World; and has been quoted by The New York Times, The Washington Post, CNN, The Guardian, The Atlanta Journal-Constitution, and other outlets.

Writings
Shahshahani writes frequently for various national and international publications such as the Nation, the Guardian, Al Jazeera, HuffPost, Salon.com, Slate, and Time on a range of issues pertaining to immigrants' rights, discrimination and state surveillance targeting Muslim communities, and foreign policy.

Awards and honors
Shahshahani is the recipient of the Shanara M. Gilbert Human Rights Award from the Society of American Law Teachers, the National Lawyers Guild Ernie Goodman Award, the Emory Law School Outstanding Leadership in the Public Interest Award, the Emory University MLK Jr. Community Service Award, the US Human Rights Network Human Rights Movement Builder Award, the American Immigration Lawyers Association Advocacy Award, the Fulton County Daily Report Distinguished Leader Award, and the University of Georgia School of Law Equal Justice Foundation Public Interest Practitioner Award, among others. She has also been recognized as an abolitionist by the Antiracist Research and Policy Center at American University & the Frederick Douglass Family Initiatives, and as one of Atlanta's 500 Most Powerful Leaders by Atlanta magazine.  In 2016, she was chosen by the Mundo Hispanico newspaper as a Personaje Destacado del Año (Outstanding Person of the Year) for defending the rights of immigrants in Georgia. In 2017, she was chosen by Georgia Trend magazine as one of the 40 under 40 notable Georgians.

Bibliography
"From the Chinese Exclusion Act to the Muslim Ban: An Immigration System Built on Systemic Racism". Harvard Law & Policy Review. 2023 (co-authored with Tina Al-khersan).
"Deploying International Law to Combat Forced Labor in Immigration Detention Centers". Georgetown Immigration Law Journal. 2022 (co-authored with Kyleen Burke).
"Movement Lawyering: A Case Study in the U.S. South". Howard Human & Civil Rights Law Review. 2020.
"Decolonizing Justice in Tunisia: From Transitional Justice to a People's Tribunal". Monthly Review. 2019 (co-authored with Corinna Mullin and Nada Trigui).
"From Pelican Bay to Palestine: The Legal Normalization of Force-Feeding Hunger-Strikers". Michigan Journal of Race & Law. 2019 (co-authored with Priya Arvind Patel).
"Sanctuary Policies: Local Resistance in the Face of State Anti-Sanctuary Legislation". City University of New York Law Review. 2018 (co-authored with Amy Pont).
"Local Police Entanglement with Immigration Enforcement in Georgia". Cardozo Law Review de•novo, 2017.  
"No Papers? You Can't Have Water: A Critique of Localities' Denial of Utilities to Undocumented Immigrants". Emory International Law Review, 2017 (co-authored with Kathryn Madison).
"Indiscriminate Power: Racial Profiling and Surveillance Since 9/11". University of Pennsylvania Journal of Law and Social Change, 2015 (co-authored with Carlos Torres and Tye Tavaras).
Immigration and Racial Profiling. Cultural Issues in Criminal Defense. 3rd & 4th editions, August 2010 and June 2015. 
"Challenging the Practice of Solitary Confinement in Immigration Detention in Georgia and Beyond". City University of New York Law Review, 2014 (co-authored with Natasha El-Sergany).
"Shattered Dreams: An Analysis of the Georgia Board of Regents' Admissions Ban from a Constitutional and International Human Rights Perspective". Hastings Race and Poverty Law Journal, 2013 (co-authored with Chaka Washington).
"The legacy of US intervention and the Tunisian revolution: promises and challenges one year on". Interface. 4 (1): 67-101, May 2012 (co-authored with Corinna Mullin).
"Reflections on the Occasion of the Tenth Anniversary of September 11". Race/Ethnicity: Multidisciplinary Global Contexts. 4 (3) 2011. 
"Reflections". Shifting Balance Sheets: Women's Stories of Naturalized Citizenship & Cultural Attachment. July 1, 2011.

References 

Year of birth missing (living people)
Living people
American lawyers
American women lawyers
Human rights lawyers
American civil rights lawyers
University of Michigan Law School alumni
21st-century American women